Lady Hamilton was the mistress of Horatio Nelson.

Lady Hamilton may also refer to:

 Lady Hamilton (1921 film), a silent German film directed by Richard Oswald
 , a vessel built in Denmark that the British captured
 That Hamilton Woman, a 1941 British film directed by Alexander Korda
 Emma Hamilton (film), a 1968 European film directed by Christian-Jacque